The Houde Speedmax is a French racing ultralight aircraft, designed and produced by Patrice Houde of Reichshoffen. The aircraft is supplied as plans, as a kit for amateur construction or as a complete ready-to-fly-aircraft, certified under JAR-VLA.

Design and development
The Speedmax features a cantilever low-wing, a single seat enclosed cockpit under a bubble canopy, fixed conventional landing gear and a single engine in tractor configuration.

The aircraft is made from wood, with some parts fabricated from carbon fibre. The standard engine available is the  Rotax 582 two-stroke powerplant. Two  fuel tanks are fitted. The aircraft was designed for aerobatics and stressed to +6 and -5g.

Specifications (Speedmax)

References

2010s French ultralight aircraft
Homebuilt aircraft
Single-engined tractor aircraft